Wheels is the third studio album by American bluegrass musician Dan Tyminski. The album peaked at number 1 on the Top Bluegrass Albums chart. It won the 2009 International Bluegrass Music Award for Album of the Year and was nominated for a Grammy Award.

Background

Wheels was released on Rounder Records as part of the Dan Tyminski band in 2008, during a break from playing with the Lonesome River Band. Tyminski played Martin and Bourgeois guitars and Sim Daley played mandolins. Additional personnel includes Adam Steffey on mandolin and Barry Bales on bass. The album won the 2009 International Bluegrass Music Award for Album of the Year and was also nominated for a Grammy.

Track listing

Personnel
 Barry Bales - bass, vocals
 Ron Block - guitar
 Vince Gill - vocals
 Adam Steffey - mandolin
 Justin Moses - banjo, fiddle, resonator guitar, vocals
 Ron Stewart - fiddle, banjo
 Cheryl White - vocals
 Sharon White - vocals
 Dan Tyminski - guitar, vocals

Chart performance

References

2008 albums
Dan Tyminski albums
Rounder Records albums